Tathall End is a hamlet in the civil parish of Hanslope, Buckinghamshire. It is 1 mile from Hanslope village, and 3 miles from Castlethorpe. The River Tove flows through it. Several properties date back to the 17th century, including Tathall End Farmhouse, dated at 1640.

References

Hamlets in Buckinghamshire